The F3, also known as the Vadistanbul Skyrail and officially referred to as the F3 Vadistanbul-Seyrantepe funicular line, is a  long funicular railway in Sarıyer, Istanbul. The line is one of three funicular railways in Turkey, all of them in Istanbul, and is the only one that operates above ground. Due to the fact that the F3 runs along a concrete viaduct, it has been advertised as a Monorail even though it is technically a funicular railway. The route runs between Vadistanbul and Seyrantepe, where connection to the M2 line is available.

The F3 was opened on 29 October 2017.

Overview

The F3 route runs in southern Sarıyer, just west of Maslak. The large majority of the route is elevated with a concrete viaduct and consists of two stations. The northwest terminus of the F3, Vadistanbul station, is located within a glass Spheroid structure that connects to the 2nd floor of the Vadistanbul Shopping Center. The southeast terminus, Seyrantepe station, is located underground on the northern side of the O-2 expressway. A tunnel underneath the expressway connects to the M2 station. The total construction cost of the line was € 15 million.

Line

References

Istanbul Metro
Railway lines opened in 2017
Passenger rail transport in Turkey
Standard gauge railways in Turkey
2017 establishments in Turkey
Sarıyer
Funicular railways in Istanbul